Doris June Tomasa Garcia  (née Cayetano) was the first female President of the Senate of Belize.

Biography
Garcia was born in 1943 to Victoria Herera and Solomon Cayetano. After high school, she went to Honduras for agricultural training.

Career
In 1983, Garcia ran for a seat on the Dangriga Town Council. In the 1984 General Election, she ran but lost for the UDP standard bearer. 

Prime Minister Manuel Esquivel offered her the position to be President of the Senate, which she accepted. Garcia served from  December 21, 1984 until July 31, 1989. She has since retired from politics.

Personal life
Garcia has two sons and three daughters.

References

1943 births
Members of the Senate (Belize)
United Democratic Party (Belize) politicians